Thomas Callaghan (1886 – 20 February 1917) was an English professional footballer who played as an outside right in the Football League for Glossop and Manchester City. He also played in the Scottish League for Partick Thistle and St Mirren.

Personal life 
In March 1916, in the middle of the First World War, Callaghan enlisted in the British Army. He served as a private in the Somerset Light Infantry and the London Regiment. Whilst maintaining an artillery gun, Callaghan was killed while serving with the 1st/20th Battalion, London Regiment, part of the 47th (1/2nd London) Division, by German shellfire during a trench raid at Hill 60, Belgium on 20 February 1917. He was buried in Chester Farm Cemetery, near Ypres.

Career statistics

References

1886 births
1917 deaths
Footballers from Birmingham, West Midlands
English footballers
Association football outside forwards
Birmingham City F.C. players
Halesowen Town F.C. players
Glossop North End A.F.C. players
Manchester City F.C. players
Partick Thistle F.C. players
St Mirren F.C. players
English Football League players
Scottish Football League players
British Army personnel of World War I
Somerset Light Infantry soldiers
British military personnel killed in World War I
London Regiment soldiers
Military personnel from Birmingham, West Midlands